Tiffany is an unincorporated community on the Southern Ute Indian Reservation in La Plata County, Colorado, United States.

History
A post office called Tiffany was established in 1907, and remained in operation until 1954.  The community was named after Ed Tiffany, a pioneer settler.

See also

References

External links

Unincorporated communities in La Plata County, Colorado
Unincorporated communities in Colorado